Thom Mayne (born January 19, 1944) is an American architect. He is based in Los Angeles. In 1972, Mayne helped found the Southern California Institute of Architecture (SCI-Arc), where he is a trustee and the coordinator of the Design of Cities postgraduate program. Since then he has held teaching positions at SCI-Arc, the California State Polytechnic University, Pomona (Cal Poly Pomona) and the University of California, Los Angeles (UCLA). He is principal of Morphosis Architects, an architectural firm based in Culver City, California and New York City, New York. Mayne received the Pritzker Architecture Prize in March 2005.

Early life and career

Mayne was born in Waterbury, Connecticut. He studied architecture at the University of Southern California (1968) and also studied at the Harvard University Graduate School of Design in 1978, with a social agenda and urban planning focus, receiving his bachelor's degree, he began working as an urban planner under Korean-born architect Ki Suh Park. During that time he recalls that "policy and planning were not going to work for me" and that he "needed a more tangible resolution." Mayne found himself living on a commune with the grass-roots group Campaign for Economic Democracy, many of whom became his earliest clients.

In 1972, Mayne abruptly left Cal Poly Pomona and collaborated with five other students and educators whom he met at while at USC, to create the Southern California Institute of Architecture, or SCI-Arc. The rift was due to differences between the dean at Cal Poly at the time and Ray Kappe, who headed the school's architecture department. The goal of the new institute was to reinvigorate formal architectural education with a keener sense of social conscience. SCI-Arc was "to bring to Los Angeles the critical attitude toward the profession that was being practiced at Cooper Union in New York and the Architectural Association in London."

Morphosis
Mayne and some others founded Morphosis in 1972; Michael Rotondi joined in 1975. The firm's design philosophy arises from an interest in producing work with a meaning that can be understood by absorbing the culture for which it was made, and their goal was to develop an architecture that would eschew the normal bounds of traditional forms. Beginning as an informal collaboration of designers that survived on non-architectural projects, its first official commission was a school in Pasadena, attended by Mayne's son.  Publicity from this project led to a number of residential commissions, including the Lawrence Residence. Mayne describes the early days of the group as more of a "garage band" than a practice. They spent their free time experimenting with new inventions for their clients, whom consisted of friends and parents of students.

When work was at a standstill, Mayne took a year off to earn his Master of Architecture degree from Harvard University. He graduated in 1978 and returned to work for Morphosis where he became the principal architect, lead designer and principal in charge for all of Morphosis' projects. The firm has grown into prominent design practice, with completed projects worldwide. Under the Design Excellence program of the United States government's General Service Administration, Thom Mayne has become a primary architect for federal projects. Recent commissions include: graduate housing at the University of Toronto; the San Francisco Federal Building; the University of Cincinnati Student Recreation Center; the Science Center School in Los Angeles, Diamond Ranch High School in Pomona, California; and the Wayne L. Morse United States Courthouse in Eugene, Oregon.

The work of Morphosis has a layered quality. Visually, the firm's architecture includes sculptural forms. In recent years, such visual effect has been made possible increasingly through computer design techniques, which simplify the construction of complex forms.

Controversy 
Early in his career, Mayne became notorious for having an abusive temper, screaming at clients. “None of my clients would recommend me,” he later admitted.

In late summer 2002, Mayne was asked by New York magazine to contribute a proposal for the World Trade Center site, where recovery and cleanup had just ended. In discussing his plan, Mayne told an interviewer his thoughts about the September 11th attacks. “I have no empathy; it doesn’t make me weep. I could make a better case for justifying the terror than the other way around.”

Academics
Mayne taught at the University of Pennsylvania and has held teaching positions at many institutions including Columbia University, Harvard University, Yale University, the Berlage Institute in the Netherlands and the Bartlett School of Architecture in London. He was a tenured faculty member at the UCLA School of Arts and Architecture. In 2013, he contributed a foreword to the book "Never Built Los Angeles" by Sam Lubell and Greg Goldin. Now he is a faculty member at SCI-Arc and UPenn.

Major projects

Completed
Kate Mantilini / Beverly Hills, CA, 1986
6th Street Residence, Santa Monica, CA, 1988
Cedar Sinai Comprehensive Cancer Center, Los Angeles, CA, 1988
Crawford Residence, Montecito, CA, 1990
Salick Healthcare Office Building, Los Angeles, CA, 1991
Blades Residence, Santa Barbara, California, 1995
Sun Tower in Seoul, Korea 1997
Diamond Ranch High School, Pomona, California, 1999
University of Toronto Graduate House, Toronto, Ontario, Canada, 2000
Hypo Alpe-Adria Center, Klagenfurt, Austria, 2002
Caltrans District 7 Headquarters, Los Angeles, California, 2004
Science Center School, Los Angeles, California, 2004
University of Cincinnati Student Recreation Center, Cincinnati, Ohio, 2006
Public housing in Madrid, Spain, 2006
Wayne L. Morse United States Courthouse, Eugene, Oregon, 2006
San Francisco Federal Building, San Francisco, California, 2006
Cahill Center for Astronomy and Astrophysics at the California Institute of Technology, Pasadena, California, 2009
National Oceanic Atmospheric Administration (NOAA) Satellite Operation Facility, Suitland, Maryland, 2007
New Academic Building at 41 Cooper Square, The Cooper Union for the Advancement of Science and Art, New York, New York, 2009
Perot Museum of Nature & Science, Dallas, Texas, 2012
Bill and Melinda Gates Hall, Cornell University, Ithaca, New York, 2013
Emerson College Los Angeles Center, Los Angeles, California, 2014
Vialia Vigo, Vigo, Galicia, Spain, 2018

In progress
Cornell NYC Tech, Roosevelt Island, New York, 2017
A. Alfred Taubman Engineering, Architecture and Life Sciences Complex, Lawrence Technological University, Southfield, Michigan (2016)

Awards and honors
Mayne has been the recipient of many distinguished awards over the course of his career. Among them are the Rome Prize Fellowship which he received in 1987 and the Pritzker Prize in 2005. Mayne was a member of the Holcim Awards global jury in 2006 and a member of the Holcim Awards jury for region North America in 2005. In 2009, he was appointed as a member of the President's Committee on the Arts and the Humanities. He was elected to the board of trustees of SCI-Arc in 2011. In 2015, Mayne was a member of the Prix Versailles judges panel.

List of awards and honors
 Rome Prize Fellowship, American Academy in Rome, Italy / 1987
 Eliel Saarinen Chair, Yale School of Architecture, Yale University / 1991
 Brunner Prize or Award in Architecture, American Academy of Arts and Letters / 1992
 Los Angeles Gold Medal, American Institute of Architects / 2000
 Chrysler Design Award of Excellence / 2001
 Pritzker Prize / 2005
 Top Ten Green Project Award, American Institute of Architects Committee on the Environment / 2007
 The Edward MacDowell Medal / 2008
 Neutra Medal for Professional Excellence / 2011
 American Institute of Architects Gold Medal / 2013

Ray Bradbury house
A controversy developed in January 2015 after Mayne bought in June 2014 for $1.765 million. The Cheviot Hills, Los Angeles house that noted writer Ray Bradbury had lived in for 50 years. According to Mayne, who did not know when he found that house that it was Bradbury's, the Bradbury family – which has not commented on the situation – had no interest in preserving the house, and Mayne bought it from a foundation. A demolition permit was issued on December 30, and in January 2015 it was reported that the house was being torn down.

Materials from Bradbury's home office were donated to the Indiana-based Center for Ray Bradbury studies, which intended to raise money to recreate it as it was in the mid-1960s. When queried, the Morphosis office reported that the house was not being razed, but "deconstructed" so that some of the materials could be recycled – including into 451 sets of bookends – a process which takes more time than simply tearing it down.  It was reported at the time that a contractor said that the house Mayne intended to build would have three underground levels, including a swimming pool, and two stories above ground – although Mayne himself said that plans for the house were not finished. "Our house will not be ordinary – our house is going to be a garden", Mayne said, and expects it to be a "prototype that is landscape-neutral and water friendly", an example of a new vision for houses in Los Angeles. Mayne also plans to pay tribute to Bradbury with a wall in which the titles of Bradbury's books are inscribed.

Construction on the new house is scheduled to finish 2017.

See also
 Morphosis Architects

References
Notes

Bibliography
Ayyuce, Orhan ""Thom Mayne in Coffee Break" - Archinect (July, 2007)
Orlandoni, Alessandra ""Interview with Thom Mayne" - The Plan 014 (May 2006)

External links

Morphosis.com - Official Website
Metropolis article on Mayne
 TED Talks.com: Thom Mayne on architecture as connection" — at 2005 TED (conference).

Postmodern architects
Pritzker Architecture Prize winners
1944 births
Living people
Architects from Los Angeles
Southern California Institute of Architecture faculty
California State Polytechnic University, Pomona faculty
Columbia University faculty
Educators from Greater Los Angeles
Harvard Graduate School of Design alumni
USC School of Architecture alumni
Architects from Waterbury, Connecticut
People from Whittier, California
20th-century American architects
21st-century American architects
UCLA School of the Arts and Architecture faculty
Recipients of the AIA Gold Medal
Members of the American Academy of Arts and Letters